Steven Wayne Schindler (born July 24, 1954) is a former professional American football Guard who played for two seasons for the Denver Broncos. The Broncos selected him in the 1977 NFL Draft with the 18th pick.

College career
Schindler played college football for the Boston College Eagles and was a three-year starter.  He was selected to multiple 1st team All-American lists in 1976, including those published by the Football Writers Association, the Newspaper Enterprise Association, The Sporting News and Football News.

Schindler was inducted into the Boston College Varsity Club Athletic Hall of Fame in 1998.

References

1954 births
Living people
People from Caldwell, New Jersey
American football offensive guards
Boston College Eagles football players
Denver Broncos players